Asad Qeshlaqi may refer to:
 Asad Qeshlaqi 1
 Asad Qeshlaqi 2
 Asad Qeshlaqi 3